This is a listing of the horses that finished in either first, second, or third place and the number of starters in the Sir Barton Stakes, an American stakes race for three-year-olds at 1-1/16 miles on dirt held at Pimlico Race Course in Baltimore, Maryland.  

A * designates that the race ended in a Deadheat for first in 1995.

References 

Pimlico Race Course
Lists of horse racing results